San Bartolome District is one of thirty-two districts of the Huarochirí Province, located in the Department of Lima in Peru. The district was created by the Law No. 12001 in November 9, 1953, during the presidency of Manuel A. Odría. It encompasses an area of 43.91 km2.

km2 References